Sébastien Lemire  is a Canadian politician, who was elected to the  House of Commons of Canada in the 2019 election. He represents the electoral district of Abitibi—Témiscamingue as a member of the Bloc Québécois.

On 21 April 2021, Lemire admitted to taking a photo of a naked Will Amos on a Zoom call and offered an apology in the House of Commons to that MP.

Electoral record

References

External links

Bloc Québécois MPs
21st-century Canadian politicians
Living people
Members of the House of Commons of Canada from Quebec
Year of birth missing (living people)
People from Rouyn-Noranda